The BAT F.K.26 was a British single-engined four-passenger biplane transport aircraft produced by British Aerial Transport Company Limited of London at the end of World War I.

Design and development
As the First World War drew to a close the aircraft designer Frederick Koolhoven designed a civil four-passenger wooden and fabric civil transport, the F.K.26.  The four passengers had an enclosed cabin and the pilot sat above and behind the cabin in an open cockpit.  The prototype (Registered K-102) first flew in April 1919.  The second aircraft was displayed at the First Air Traffic Exhibition in Amsterdam in July 1919.  The third machine (also known as the BAT Commercial Mk 1) was displayed at the Olympia Aero Show in July 1920.  The fourth aircraft (Registered G-EAPK), built in November 1919, was the last aircraft produced by the British Aerial Transport Company (BAT).  G-EAPK was sold to Instone Air Line and was based at Croydon Airport for charter work and scheduled services to Paris.

When the company closed, Koolhoven returned to Netherlands.  He later bought G-EEAI (the prototype) and exhibited it at the 1937 Netherlands Aero Show.

Operators

Instone Air Line operated 1 aircraft.

Specifications (F.K.26)

See also

Notes

References

External links

BAT F.K.26 – British Aircraft Directory
Koolhoven Aeroplanes Foundation – World's first airliner
 Contemporary technical description with drawings.

1910s British airliners
FK26
Biplanes
Single-engined tractor aircraft
F.K.26
Aircraft first flown in 1919